This is a list of bands that have played screamo at some point in their careers.

Screamo is a music genre which predominantly evolved from emo, among other genres, in the early 1990s. The term "screamo" was initially applied to a more aggressive offshoot of emo that developed in San Diego in the early 1990s, which used usually short songs that grafted "spastic intensity to willfully experimental dissonance and dynamics." Screamo is a particularly dissonant style of emo influenced by hardcore punk and uses typical rock instrumentation, but is noted for its brief compositions, chaotic execution, and screaming vocals. The genre is "generally based in the aggressive side of the overarching punk-revival scene, although the term can be vague. The genre was pioneered by bands like Heroin and Antioch Arrow.

A 
Alesana
Alexisonfire
 Ampere
 Antioch Arrow

B 
The Blood Brothers

C 
 Circle Takes the Square
 City of Caterpillar

D 
 Daitro
 Deafheaven

E 
 Envy
 An Evening at Elmwood

F 
 Far
 From Autumn to Ashes
 Funeral Diner
 Funeral for a Friend

G 
 Graf Orlock

H 
 Hawthorne Heights
 Heaven in Her Arms
 He Is Legend
 Here I Come Falling* Heroin
 Hot Cross

I 
 I Hate Myself
 Infant Island

J 
 Jeromes Dream

L 
 La Dispute
 La Quiete
 Loma Prieta

M 
 Majority Rule
 Merchant Ships

N 
 Neil Perry
 Nitro Mega Prayer

O 
 Off Minor
 Old Gray
 Orchid

P 
 Pg. 99
 Pianos Become the Teeth
 Poison the Well
 Portraits of Past
 Portrayal of Guilt

R 
 Racebannon
 Raein

S 
 Saetia
 Senses Fail
 Shotmaker
 Showbread
 Silverstein
 State Faults
 A Static Lullaby
 Suis La Lune
 Swing Kids

T 
 A Thorn for Every Heart
 Thursday
 Touché Amoré

U 
 Underoath
 United Nations
 The Used
 Usurp Synapse

V 
 Vendetta Red

References 

 
Lists of hardcore punk bands